Bryan Fraser (born January 31, 1991) is a retired professional volleyball player from Canada. He was a member of the Canada men's national volleyball team from 2015 to 2016. He is now the current head coach of the women's volleyball program at College of the Rockies in Cranbrook, British Columbia.

References

1991 births
Living people
Canadian men's volleyball players
Sportspeople from North Battleford